Fatum is a drainage mill near the village of Tzum, Friesland, Netherlands. It is a hollow post windmill of the type called "spinnenkop" by the Dutch. The mill is listed as a Rijksmonument, number 15876 and is in working order though it can no longer be used for drainage.

History
The substructure probably dates from the 18th century and still carries traces of the damage caused when it caught fire during storms in 1914 and 1915, after which the mill was rebuilt.
A merger of several polders around Tzum that was proposed in 1910 would have left the mill without function and threatened its survival, however the plans were called off in 1924. At some time in the second half of the 20th century the stocks were fitted with patent sails. These were replaced by common sails when the mill was restored in 1969 by millwright De Roos, though the Fauël leading edge on one stock was retained. During the restoration in 1989 amongst others the stocks and windshaft were replaced.

Description

Fatum is what the Dutch describe as a "spinnenkop" (English: spiderhead mill). It is a small hollow post mill winded by a winch. The mill has common sails. The steel stocks are carried on a cast-iron windshaft cast by Gieterij Hardinxveld as number 30 in 1989. The brake wheel on the windshaft drives the wallower at the top of the upright shaft in the body (called head on a spinnenkop), which passed through the main post into the substructure. At the bottom of the upright shaft is the crown wheel which drives the wooden Archimedes' screw. The body (called head on a spinnenkop) and substructure are weatherboarded.

Public access
The mill is open to the public on appointment.

References

Windmills in Friesland
Hollow post mills in the Netherlands
Rijksmonuments in Friesland